Macomb  is an unincorporated community in Wright County, Missouri, United States.

A post office called Macomb has been in operation since 1886. The community has the name of the local Macomb family.

References

Unincorporated communities in Wright County, Missouri
Unincorporated communities in Missouri